Fellside may refer to:
Fellside, Gauteng, South Africa
Fellside, Kendal, England
Fellside, Tyne and Wear, England

See also
Fellside Records
Fell Side